is a passenger railway station on the Tōbu Kiryū Line in the city of Kiryū, Gunma, Japan, operated by the private railway operator Tōbu Railway.

Lines

Station layout
The station has one side platform and one island platform connected to the station building by an underground passage.

Platforms

Adjacent stations

History
Shin-Kiryū Station was opened on March 19, 1913. A new station building was completed in 1988. 
From March 17, 2012, station numbering was introduced on all Tobu lines, with Shin-Kiryū Station becoming "TI-55".

Passenger statistics
In fiscal 2019, the station was used by an average of 2204 passengers daily (boarding passengers only).

Surrounding area
 Kiryū City Hall

See also
 List of railway stations in Japan

References

External links

  
	

Tobu Kiryu Line
Stations of Tobu Railway
Railway stations in Gunma Prefecture
Railway stations in Japan opened in 1913
Kiryū, Gunma